Orange Grove Independent School District is a public school district based in Orange Grove, Texas (USA).

In addition to Orange Grove, the district also serves the communities of Alfred, K-Bar Ranch, Sandia, South La Paloma, Westdale, the Jim Wells County portion of Pernitas Point.

In 2009, the school district was rated "academically acceptable" by the Texas Education Agency.

The school’s mascot is a bulldog. In turn their football team of the same name is above average in performance.

The yearbook is titled The Bark.

Schools
Orange Grove High (Grades 9-12)
Orange Grove Junior High (Grades 6-8)
Orange Grove Intermediate (Grades 4-5)
Orange Grove Elementary (Grades 2-3)
Orange Grove Primary (Grades PK-1)

References

External links
 

School districts in Jim Wells County, Texas